The Saarland B national football team was a secondary men's national football team which represented the Saar Protectorate. It was used to try out and develop players for potential inclusion in the first team. Its matches are not considered full internationals. The team played one match on 1 May 1955 against the Netherlands B team.

Match
The only match of Saarland's B team took place on 1 May 1955 at the Ellenfeldstadion in Neunkirchen against the Netherlands. Saarland led 2–0 at half-time, before Jan van Roessel reduced the deficit for the Netherlands in the second half. Saarland scored two more goals, with Van Roessel scoring in between, to finish as a 4–2 win.

Players
The following eleven players appeared for the B team in the match, as no substitutes were used. Nine of the players also appeared for the first team.

See also
List of Saarland international footballers

References

B
European national B association football teams